Valsequillo de Gran Canaria is a town and a municipality in the eastern part of the island of Gran Canaria in the Province of Las Palmas in the Canary Islands. Its population is 9,170 (2013), and the area is 39.15 km².

Valsequillo is situated in the mountains, 5 km west of Telde and 16 km southwest of Las Palmas.

Historical population

Gallery

See also
List of municipalities in Las Palmas

References

External links
Official site

Municipalities in Gran Canaria